Ivan Boboshko (died 3 December 2012) was a Soviet football player and coach. A forward, he played for eight seasons in Shakhtar Donetsk.

In 1956 Boboshko played couple of games for Ukraine at the Spartakiad of the Peoples of the USSR and scoring one goal.

On 3 December 2012 Boboshko died at the age of 83.

References

External links
 Profile at footballfacts

1930 births
2012 deaths
Sportspeople from Kryvyi Rih
Soviet footballers
Ukrainian footballers
Association football forwards
FC Dnipro players
FC Lokomotyv Kharkiv players
FC Shakhtar Donetsk players
Soviet football managers
FC Mariupol managers